The Khazeni family, Khazeni-Rad and Khazenifar family was a prominent Iranian industrial and mercantile family, active in Iran from the Qajar dynasty. Throughout the 20th century the main activities of the family were the manufacture and distribution of steel and fabrics products through its company The Cheltenham Company, which included the import of Japanese Iron and commodities such as cotton.

History
The Khazeni, Khazeni-Rad and Khazenifar families consist of three separate lineages, interlinked through bloodlines. After having been known as Khazeni-Allangei (Arrangei) and Abbasian, the families opted to drop the affixes and change the family name at the time of Reza Shah.

The first Tehran resident of the family, Agha Baba Khazeni is buried at Imamzadeh Abdullah, Rey. Agha Khan Khazeni, one of the founding members of the family is buried at the gateway of Shāh Abdol Azīm Shrine in the city of Rey, south of Tehran.

The Khazeni families of Tehran became well-known and prominent in Tehran by establishing the Japanese stainless steel import lines and help found a private hospital, called Arad General Hospital.

The Cheltenham Company began operating on 21 December 1954 with a board of two directors to become, five years later, one of Iran's largest import companies of Iron commodities. In 1967 the family group created the first industrial pressure gauge importing company in Iran.  In 1977, the company also began investing in Texas universities but pulled their investments after during 1978 political turmoil in Iran. The company was bought out on March 2, 1981, after the Iranian revolution.

The Abbasian family was known throughout Karaj and Tehran. They were famous for being the first doctors in the Asara area and being one of the more prominent families in Karaj before the revolution. The Abbasian family was split at the time of Reza Shah due to internal disputes and they are now known as the Abbasian and Abbasian-Nik families.

Family Organizations & Companies
The Khazeni-Rad side of the family began its expansion into the United Kingdom in the 1960s. The Khazenifar side joined them in creating multiple companies, and helped the family move into retail, specialist dental and restaurant companies in the north of England.
The Khazeni's are also based in Qatar, United Arab Emirates and the United States with interests in various other countries.

 In the 20th century, the family diversified into metal imports before moving into construction activities.
 In 1954, the family founded The Cheltenham Company. The company grew to 5 branches across the country with international branches in Liverpool, Dallas, Rome and Tokyo. 
 During the 1980s and 1990s, Mohsen Khazeni-Rad introduced new types of food and dining across the north of England.

Awards
Professor Dr. Mohammad Khazenifar Awards for Medical Excellence at Iran's Joint and Bone Science Masters Center in Tehran. Prior to this he annually awarded medals of excellence to the best performing surgeon at the Royal Liverpool University Hospital.

Recognition
Dr Sassan Khazenifar has been recognized as for his first-responder duty in the Lancaster Guardian, United Kingdom for his life-saving skills. At the time the woman who he saved responded: "He was my life saver and my mum ran up to him, gave him a big hug and started crying."

Prominent Family Members
Ali Khan Khazen-ul Molk, member of the aristocracy during the Nasser Naser al-Din Shah Qajar period in the late 19th century.
Agha Baba Khazeni-Arangei, merchant, manufacturer and importer of spices and  large landowner in Tehran, married to Zahra Khanom (Khanom), daughter of Haj Seyyed Ali, large landowner in Iran at the time of Naser al-Din Shah Qajar
Dr Mohammad Khazenifar, became well known in the 1990s for handing out an award for medical excellence at Liverpool University. Son of Agha Baba Khazeni-Alangei founder of Arad Hospital
 Dr Arash Khazeni, Associate Professor Department of History at Pomona College and PhD from Yale University
 Mory Khazeni, Technology entrepreneur and founder of Living in Tehran.
 Mohsen Khazeni-Rad, Director of several companies in the United Kingdom
 Dr Sassan Khazenifar, Currently is an Oral and maxillofacial surgery surgeon at Sheffield National Health Service, son of Mohammad Khazenifar
 Reza Ali Khazeni, writer and expert on Iranian history. http://mec.utah.edu/RAK_Lecture.php
Dr Mohammad Khazeni, Virologist in Tehran medical University TUMS'''

References

External links
 The management of childhood osteomyelitis.
 Khazenifar Medical Practice
 Khazenifar emergency life saver
 Joint and Bone Science Masters Center Khazenifar Award for Medical Excellence in Iran
 Nonselective Mevalonate Kinase Inhibitor as a Novel Class of Antibacterial Agents, Mohammad Khazeni

Iranian families
Business families
Economy of Iran
Iranian philanthropists
People of Qajar Iran
People of Pahlavi Iran